Here I Am is the debut studio album by American R&B/hip-hop artist Joya, released on June 20, 1995, on the label A&M Records. The album's sound is a blend of R&B, soul and hip hop; featured are the minor R&B hit singles – "I Like What You're Doing to Me", which reached number 46 on the U.S. Billboard Hot R&B Singles chart, and "Gettin' off on You", which peaked at number 67. The CD single release for "Gettin' off on You" was packaged with a condom, emphasizing the single's racy lyrics.

Track listing

Personnel 
 Joya – Lead vocals, background vocals
 Vincent Herbert – Executive producer
 Arte Skye – Engineer
 Dave Collins – Mastered

Charts

Singles

References

External links
thisisjoya.com
Joya-Here I Am (CD Album)
music-cduniverse.com

1995 debut albums
Joya (singer) albums
A&M Records albums